John Hill (born 17 January 1884) was a Scottish footballer who played for Dumbarton, Dumbarton Harp, Celtic,  Vale of Leven and Renton.

References

1884 births
Scottish footballers
Dumbarton F.C. players
Celtic F.C. players
Year of death missing
Scottish Football League players
Place of death missing
Vale of Leven F.C. players
Renton F.C. players
Association footballers not categorized by position